Paealaethia is a monotypic moth genus in the subfamily Arctiinae erected by George Hampson in 1907. Its single species, Paralaethia subformicina, was first described by George Thomas Bethune-Baker in 1904. It is found in New Guinea.

References

Arctiinae